Charles Vivian may refer to:

Charles Vivian, 2nd Baron Vivian (1808–1886), British peer and Whig politician
E. C. Vivian (1882–1947), British editor and writer
John Charles Vivian (1887–1964), American attorney, journalist and politician
Charles Vivian, founder of the Benevolent and Protective Order of Elks

See also
Vivian Charles, a character in Pushing Daisies
Vivian (disambiguation)